2020–21 Albanian Cup was the sixty-ninth season of Albania's annual cup competition, the Albanian Cup. Teuta were the defending champions. Vllaznia won the cup, their seventh title in the competition.

Format
Unlike the previous season, all ties are played in a one-leg format, due to a congested schedule. If the score is tied after the regular time, the match is decided by extra time and a penalty shoot-out, if necessary. The preliminary round did not take place.

First round
All 27 eligible teams of the 2020–21 Kategoria Superiore and Kategoria e Parë entered in this round along with 5 teams from the Kategoria e Dytë. The matches were played on 1 November 2020.

|}

Tirana advanced to the second round.

Laçi advanced to the second round.

Teuta advanced to the second round.

Bylis advanced to the second round.

Dinamo Tirana advanced to the second round.

Kastrioti advanced to the second round.

Egnatia advanced to the second round.

Korabi advanced to the second round.

Kukësi advanced to the second round.

Skënderbeu advanced to the second round.

Partizani advanced to the second round.

Vllaznia advanced to the second round.

Elbasani advanced to the second round.

Apolonia advanced to the second round.

Pogradeci advanced to the second round.

Besa advanced to the second round.

Second round
All the 16 qualified teams from the First Round progressed to the Second Round and The matches were played on 12, 13 and 14 November 2020.

|}

Korabi advanced to the quarter finals.

Laçi advanced to the quarter finals.

Teuta advanced to the quarter finals.

Dinamo Tirana advanced to the quarter finals.

Kukësi advanced to the quarter finals.

Skënderbeu advanced to the quarter finals.

Partizani advanced to the quarter finals.

Vllaznia advanced to the quarter finals.

Quarter-finals
All eight qualified teams from the second round progressed to the quarter-finals. The matches were played on 17 March 2021.

|}

Laçi advanced to the semi finals.

Vllaznia advanced to the semi finals.

Teuta advanced to the semi finals.

Skënderbeu advanced to the semi finals.

Semi-finals
The matches were played on 14 April.

|}

Vllaznia advanced to the final.

Skënderbeu advanced to the final.

Final

References

Cup
Albanian Cup seasons
Albanian Cup